Encephalitis Society is a non-profit organisation providing information and support for those affected by encephalitis, an inflammation of the brain, raising awareness and funding and collaborating on research on the condition.

The Society provides support and opportunities to connect for individuals and families whose lives have been impacted by encephalitis. It funds, collaborates, and promotes research into all aspects of this condition. It also raises awareness of encephalitis among the public and medical and health professionals.

The Chief Executive is Dr Ava Easton who is also a researcher (Honorary Fellow in the Dept. of Clinical Infection, Microbiology and Immunology, University of Liverpool) and global expert on encephalitis patient outcomes and quality of life.

The Society's work 
The Encephalitis Society provides support and information to people affected by encephalitis directly or indirectly, raises awareness of encephalitis, and drives research into the neurological condition by working with a variety of professionals and organisations from health, social care, and education globally.

Support and information 
The Support Service at the Society provides support and information via telephone helpline, email, online chat on their website, and Zoom sessions on request. The Society holds virtual webinars and support groups, as well as face-to-face events, weekends for children and their families, and adult retreats. It also developed a global volunteer scheme called Team Encephalitis. It provides a language line on request for its worldwide audience.

The Society has a resource library available on paper and via the Worldwide Web, and provides information in digital formats: e-learning, animations and videos (e.g., Youtube). In 2019 there were 20,157 downloads of information from the website, and enquiries increased by 50% from 49.5 million people across 189 countries through WED. 

During the COVID-19 Pandemic, the Encephalitis Society introduced more online support initiatives, including an Encephalitis Support Forum, Virtual Gatherings and The Encephalitis Podcast.

Research 
 
The Encephalitis Society funds and collaborates on research into encephalitis and its consequences. It holds an international annual conference for professionals on the condition.

The Encephalitis Society works in conjunction with several universities to develop research, most notably Oxford University, University of Liverpool, and University College London (UCL) and Kings College London.

It collaborates with a worldwide brain infectious group, and other encephalitis organisations worldwide.

The Society awards annual grant funding through seed funding, PhD and Fellowships. They also give travel bursaries to medical students and junior physicians in low-to-middle income countries to attend the Encephalitis Conference.

It works in partnership with other neurological charities and health organisations at national and international level, to support rapid diagnosis and access to services.

Its Scientific Advisory Panel consists of experts in encephalitis, including  Tom Solomon , Angela Vincent, Barbara Wilson. The vice chair of the panel is Benedict Michael and chair is Nicholas Davies.

A Global Impact Report developed by Encephalitis Society identified a range of difficulties and solutions to the global impact of encephalitis which could save lives and improve the treatment and after-care of millions of people today and into the future. A working group was put together between the WHO and the Encephalitis Society resulting in the launch of the report in and an initial meeting (2022) where global partners and stakeholders, including WHO, discussed how to tackle encephalitis urgently in the coming years.

Fundraising 
Awareness of encephalitis is raised through campaigns such as Encephalitis Research Month, Encephalitis Information Week and World Encephalitis Day. Their fundraising events bring about awareness of the charity, such as Twitter Art Exhibit (TAE) and Radio 4 Appeal.

In 2020 they reached almost 6 million people in 28 countries through Research Month.

The mission to raise awareness has the support of several high-profile ambassadors, including Rebecca Adlington, Mathew Bose, Karen Tighe, Suzie Miller, Susannah Cahalan, Simon Hattenstone and Aled Davies.

Statistics 
Over half a million people a year worldwide are affected by encephalitis 6,000 children and adults in the UK are affected with the condition each year (Case for Support 2021 Pg.4)

Mortality, depending on the cause, is up to 40%.

77% of people around the world do not know what encephalitis is.

Encephalitis has a higher incidence than motor neurone disease, bacterial meningitis, multiple sclerosis and cerebral palsy in several countries.

Activities 
 The Encephalitis Society provides support and information to people affected directly or indirectly by encephalitis, and to a variety of professionals and organisations from health, social care and education globally.

The Society holds weekends for families, and adult retreats and operates a global volunteer scheme called Team Encephalitis. The Society has information on paper and via the Worldwide Web. World Encephalitis Day was created by the Society in 2014, and fundraising events are run. The Society collaborates and funds research into encephalitis and its consequences, and holds an annual conference on the condition and annual competitions and travel bursaries for medical students and junior physicians. The charity works with other neurological charities and health organisations.

In September 2017, it was named the Charity Times Charity of the Year with an income less than £1 million.

Awards 
The Encephalitis Society has won a number of awards, including;

 Silver Chartered Institute of Public Relations (CIPR) Award for World Encephalitis Day 2014
 BMA Patient Information Awards 2016 – Highly Commended
 2017 Charity Times' Charity of the Year: with an income less than £1 million
 Charity Times's Fundraising Technology of the Year (2018)  
 Best use of Digital, Digital Impact Awards (2018) 
 Charity Comms Inspiring Communicator Award (2019) for Dr Ava Easton 
 Social CEO of the Year Award in The Social CEO Awards (2019) for Dr Ava Easton  
 Celebrity Charity Champion and Communications Campaign of the Year in the Third Sector Awards (2019) 
 Best use of digital by a charity, NGO or NFP (bronze) in the 2021 Digital Impact Awards
 Nominated for Fundraising Team of The Year in the Third Sector Awards (2022)

World Encephalitis Day 
The Society launched the first World Encephalitis Day on 22 February 2014.

The fourth annual World Encephalitis Day on 22 February 2017 reached an estimated 40 million people through traditional and social media. Over 50 global landmarks lit up in  red to mark the day, including Niagara Falls, the fountains at Trafalgar Square, the Swan Bell Tower, Perth, Blackpool Tower and Bolivia Triplet Bridges.

References

External links 

Medical and health organisations based in the United Kingdom
Encephalitis
Patient advocacy
Charities based in North Yorkshire